Heinola sub-region  was a subdivision of Päijänne Tavastia and one of the Sub-regions of Finland.

Municipalities
Hartola
Heinola
Sysmä

Former sub-regions of Finland
Geography of Päijät-Häme